Lewis Parsons Hobart (January 14, 1873 – October 19, 1954) was an American architect whose designs included San Francisco's Grace Cathedral, several California Academy of Sciences buildings, and the 511 Federal Building in Portland, Oregon.

Biography 
Hobart was born in St. Louis, Missouri.  He received bachelor's and master's degrees from the University of California, Berkeley, and studied at the American Academy in Rome and the École nationale supérieure des Beaux-Arts in Paris.

Hobart played a role in the rebuilding efforts of the San Francisco Bay Area following the 1906 San Francisco earthquake, designing several buildings. A number of his works are listed on the U.S. National Register of Historic Places.

The Lodge at Pebble Beach, dates to 1908 when Hobart of was hired by the Pacific Improvement Company (PIC) to design the Pebble Beach Lodge. The rustic Log cabin style inn was built of huge timbers cut from the nearby forests. Pebble Beach and the one-story lodge were announced in The San Francisco Call on May 28, 1909, with new roads that access the inn and surrounding 17-Mile Drive. 

Hobart became the first President of the San Francisco Arts Commission in 1932 and was also appointed to the Board of Architects for the 1939 Golden Gate International Exposition.

Works

Newhall Estate, 1761 Manor Dr. Hillsborough, CA (Hobart, Lewis Parsons), NRHP-listed
One or more works in Russian Hill-Paris Block Architectural District, roughly 1017-1067 Green St. San Francisco, CA (Hobart, L.P.), NRHP-listed
U.S. Post Office (Portland, Oregon), 511 NW Broadway Portland, OR (Hobart, Lewis P.), NRHP-listed
War Memorial Natatorium, Kalakaua Ave. Honolulu, HI (Hobart, Lewis P.), NRHP-listed

References

External links
Abbreviated list of architectural work

Architects from San Francisco
1873 births
1954 deaths
Historicist architects
People associated with the California Academy of Sciences
20th-century American architects
Burials at Cypress Lawn Memorial Park